Stephen W. "Steve" Landen (1952 – November 2017) was a professional American bridge player from West Bloomfield, Michigan. He was a computer consultant and graduated from University of Michigan.

Bridge accomplishments

Wins

 North American Bridge Championships (6)
 Silodor Open Pairs (1) 2010 
 Wernher Open Pairs (2) 1990, 2000 
 Blue Ribbon Pairs (1) 2007 
 North American Pairs (1) 2003 
 Reisinger (1) 2002

Runners-up

 North American Bridge Championships
 Blue Ribbon Pairs (1) 2001 
 North American Pairs (2) 1979, 1991 
 Grand National Teams (2) 1982, 2011 
 Senior Knockout Teams (1) 2010 
 Roth Open Swiss Teams (1) 2005

Notes

1952 births
2017 deaths
American contract bridge players
People from West Bloomfield, Michigan
University of Michigan alumni